Mir Najaf Ali Khan is a grandson of the last Nizam of Hyderabad, Mir Osman Ali Khan. He manages a few trusts of the last Nizam, including the Nizam's Trust.

He is also an enthusiast of the Heritage of Hyderabad, and has also criticized the Government of Telangana regarding the negligence of several heritage structures and hospitals built by the 7th Nizam - Mir Osman Ali Khan especially the Osmania General Hospital, which is going to be demolished due to irrepairable condition caused due to negligence.

Legal representation of Nizam family

He has been chosen by the Nizam's descendants to represent them in the "Hyderabad Funds Case". The case is based on £35 million (value in 2019) which used to belong to the last Nizam and is now in the NatWest Bank.   
The case was decided in London in favour of the Republic of India and the Nizam's descendants in October 2019, with the concurrent dismissal of Pakistan's claim.

Meeting other royals
Nawab Najaf Ali Khan called on Yaduveer Krishnadatta Chamaraja Wadiyar at the Mysore Palace, wherein Wadiyar highlighted the role of the Asif Jahis in protecting interests of other maharajas against the British and during the India-China war in 1965. Prince Yaduveer stated how Mir Osman Ali Khan had contributed 5,000 kg gold to support the country.

He also highlighted a lesser known fact that The 7th Nizam was kind enough to support the construction of a very important part of the Mysore Palace.

Press conferences

Appreciating the Telangana State police
Nawab Najaf Ali Khan congratulated the Telangana State Police on behalf of the Nizam Family Welfare Association for recovering the items stolen from the Nizam's Museum within a week of the theft and nabbing the culprits. He stated 
 "We cannot even put into words our joy and relief that the stolen items of our beloved Grandfather were recovered. But we are also left feeling bittersweet as our happiness is also mixed with feelings of disappointment at the management who are solely responsible for this incident,"

Complaint against Mukarram Jah
Mr. Najaf Ali Khan met the Police Commissioner and submitted the complaint along with supporting documents. He alleged in the complaint that another grandson of the Seventh Nizam, Prince Mukarram Jah alias Barkat Ali Khan, his ex-wife Esra Birgen Jah, (also the GPA holder of Prince Mukarram Jah in certain), his son Azmet Jah and his brother Prince Muffakham Jah had used false documents in the UK High Court to lay claim over the £35 million Nizam’s Fund lying in NatWest Bank there.

References

External links

Living people
People from Hyderabad State
Indian royalty
1964 births